Trifluoroacetic anhydride (TFAA) is the acid anhydride of trifluoroacetic acid. It is the perfluorinated derivative of acetic anhydride.

Preparation
Trifluoroacetic anhydride was originally prepared by the dehydration of trifluoroacetic acid with phosphorus pentoxide. The dehydration might also be carried out with excess α-halogenated acid chlorides. For example, with dichloroacetyl chloride:

 2 CF3COOH + Cl2CHCOCl → (CF3CO)2O + Cl2CHCOOH + HCl

Uses 
Trifluoroacetic anhydride has various uses in organic synthesis. 

It may be used to introduce the corresponding trifluoroacetyl group, for which it is more convenient than the corresponding acyl chloride, trifluoroacetyl chloride, which is a gas. 

It can be used to promote reactions of carboxylic acids, including nucleophilic acyl substitution, Friedel-Crafts acylation, and acylation of other unsaturated compounds. Other electrophilic aromatic substitution reactions can also be promoted with trifluoroacetic anhydride, including nitration, sulfonation and nitrosylation.

Similar to acetic anhydride, trifluoroacetic anhydride can be used as a dehydrating agent and as an activator for the Pummerer rearrangement.

It can be used in place of oxalyl chloride in the Swern oxidation, allowing temperatures up to −30 °C.

With sodium iodide, it reduces sulfoxides to sulfides.

Trifluoroacetic anhydride is the recommended desiccant for trifluoroacetic acid.

References

Carboxylic anhydrides
Trifluoromethyl compounds